The Maya Tour (stylized as /\/\ /\ Y /\ Tour) is a 2010 global M.I.A. concert tour performed in support of her third studio album Maya (see 2010 in music). It began on 21 September 2010 in North America and was M.I.A.'s third major global performing tour following the birth of her first child. The tour was announced on 8 September 2010, with dates for Canadian, American and European venues revealed. According to photo albums on the musician's official Facebook page, the North American leg was branded the Reboot/Reboost Tour 2010, while the Sexynsofistic8d Tour formed the European leg of her 2010 concerts. M.I.A. handled costumes and stage direction, which departed from the productions of the preceding 2007–2008 Kala Tour and People Vs. Money Tours.

While on tour, her performance at the LokerseFeesten in Lokeren, Flanders, Belgium drew a crowd of 13,500, the biggest of the 10-day music festival. Her performance at The Big Chill in Herefordshire, England was cut short due to a massive stage invasion by fans, while her performance at Hard Festival in New York was received negatively. She performed a show free to New York fans in light of the reaction. In Portugal performing at Festival Sudoeste, she revealed her intentions to shoot a new music video with director Spike Jonze, although this did not materialize. M.I.A. was joined on stage at the Flow Festival in Finland by Derek Miller of Sleigh Bells. Another N.E.E.T. label signee Rye Rye also opened on selected dates during the tour. The Sexynsofistic8d Tour marked M.I.A.'s second appearance at the Sónar in Barcelona, following her first appearance in 2005's Arular Tour, and saw the musician returning to perform at several venues she had first played during her debut global tour.

In January 2011, following the release of her free mixtape Vicki Leekx in the new year, she returned to the Big Day Out festival, marking M.I.A.'s first visit to New Zealand, and kick starting her Australian dates of the tour. Her costumes and style changed during this leg, having dyed her hair platinum blonde in an apparent tribute to WikiLeaks founder Julian Assange and following on from the name and themes of the mixtape. She cancelled two appearances in the UK in 2010 due to her son's sickness, and in May 2011, posted a TwitPic of her with a broken leg, playing with her son. She tweeted "Doh , scrapin playdoh off robot let brace lookin like the 5th member of black eyed peas right now" before continuing "When u stand up, 1st they break ur moral, then they break ur work, then ur leg, but the beauty in enduring is that u can endure more!" She had cancelled her February 2011 dates in Japan.

The 2010–2011 tour featured a new setlist, featuring new songs from Maya. Included as an opening intro song at venues such as Sónar and the Roskilde Festival in Denmark was an animation video accompanying the Hindu slokam Veṅkaṭeśasuprabhātam (Suprabhatam) composed by Prativādibhayaṅkara Śrī Anantācārya, the Rāmānujācārya of Kanchipuram, to awaken the deity Venkateswara of the Tirumala Venkateswara Temple. The tour ended with her performance at the Exit Festival, Novi Sad in Serbia.

Tour details

Background
M.I.A. promoted the album with a series of appearances at music festivals, including the Hard festival in New York and The Big Chill in Herefordshire. Her performance at the latter was cut short due to a stage invasion by fans. She also performed at the Flow Festival in Finland, where she was joined onstage by Derek E. Miller playing guitar during her performance of "Meds and Feds", and the LokerseFeesten in Lokeren, Flanders, Belgium, where her performance drew a crowd of 13,500, the biggest of the 10-day music festival. M.I.A. performed at the 2010 Virgin Mobile Festival, Festival Sudoeste, Way Out West Festival, Underage Festival and Øyafestivalen. In September she announced a tour, with Sleigh Bells and Rye Rye as alternating support acts, with the tour lasting until the end of the year.

Sets
M.I.A. tweeted on 19 Nov "my baby is sick @ home in london i m sorry to my liverpool fans, but ill b in leeds 2maro c u there . watching yo gabba gabba!". Subsequently, this meant her Liverpool show was cancelled.

Shows

Set list
 "The Message (Intro)"
 "Illygirl"
 "Bucky Done Gun"
 "XR2"
 "Boyz"
 "World Town"
 "Steppin' Up"
 "Teqkilla"
 "Story To Be Told"
 "Born Free"
 "Bamboo Banga"
 "Galang"
 "Paper Planes"

Tour dates

References

External links
 Official site

2010 concert tours
2011 concert tours
M.I.A. (rapper) concert tours